{{DISPLAYTITLE:C11H13N3O3S}}
The molecular formula C11H13N3O3S (molar mass: 267.30 g/mol, exact mass: 267.0678 u) may refer to:

 Sulfafurazole, or sulfisoxazole
 Sulfamoxole